Tres Lunas (also known as Tr3s Lunas) is a MusicVR video game published in 2002 by British musician Mike Oldfield. The title is Spanish for Three Moons.

History 
Oldfield had been working on the idea of melding virtual reality and music throughout the 1990s. Oldfield worked with 3D graphics programmer Colin Dooley and graphic artist Nick Catcheside. The Newlook and Modelworks software packages were used in the creation of the game. Modelworks was used to create the 3D models and Newlook is the game engine, level editor and music sequencer used to create the final game. Both software packages were written by Colin Dooley with Newlook being created specifically for the Music VR project.

2002 saw the release of Oldfield's first new album of the Millennium, entitled Tres Lunas. This was also the first publicly released MusicVR game, also titled Tres Lunas. A demo version of the game came on a second CD packaged with the album, with the full version available for purchase from Oldfield's website. The game has since become available for free. The game featured segments of music from the album Tres Lunas, along with specially composed music. In the game you can fly around the world, collecting a maximum of 7 gold rings, which change the music which you hear. You can also study or manipulate many objects, with various consequences.

By the time of the first release, Oldfield had also expressed the desire for people to share their game with others, and thus the game became a multiplayer game, with people connecting to the game world via the Internet. Each person could have their own avatar, which they would use to fly around the virtual worlds. A maximum of 13 avatars can be in use at any one time, with others being observers, all having the ability to chat. Oldfield would log in from time to time in order to chat with his fans live. Oldfield was interviewed about the game and his faith on The Heaven and Earth Show on BBC One.

A second game called Maestro was released in 2004.

Both games are available for free download from the archive page of an Oldfield fansite Tubular.net.

References

External links 
 Tubular.net - Website hosting Tres Lunas
 Tres Lunas at MobyGames

2002 video games
Flight simulation video games
Mike Oldfield
Multiplayer online games
Video games based on musicians
Music video games
Video games developed in the United Kingdom
Windows games
Windows-only games
Multiplayer and single-player video games